Dmytro Oleksiyovych Fastov (born 25 July 1997) is a Ukrainian professional footballer who plays as a goalkeeper for Karpaty Lviv.

Career
Fastov is a product of FC Dynamo Kyiv Youth Sportive School.

From summer 2013, after graduation of the youth sportive school, he played in the Ukrainian Premier League Reserves for FC Dynamo Kyiv reserves and in the Ukrainian First League for FC Dynamo-2 Kyiv. After the dissolution of FC Dynamo-2 he was signed by another Ukrainian First League team – Inhulets Petrove in March 2017. In July 2017 he was signed by the Ukrainian Premier League debutant Veres Rivne.

On 28 September 2018, he signed with Campeonato de Portugal club S.C. Ideal.

On 29 July 2022, after a short stint in Poland with Podhale Nowy Targ, he moved to Karpaty Lviv.

References

External links
 
 
 

1997 births
Living people
Footballers from Kyiv
Ukrainian footballers
Association football goalkeepers
FC Dynamo Kyiv players
FC Dynamo-2 Kyiv players
FC Inhulets Petrove players
FC Inhulets-2 Petrove players
NK Veres Rivne players
C.D. Cova da Piedade players
S.C. Ideal players
Hyères FC players
FC Obolon-Brovar Kyiv players
FC Obolon-2 Kyiv players
FC Kremin Kremenchuk players
MFC Mykolaiv players
FC LNZ Cherkasy players
FC Karpaty Lviv players
Ukrainian First League players
Ukrainian Second League players
Ukrainian expatriate footballers
Expatriate footballers in Portugal
Ukrainian expatriate sportspeople in Portugal
Expatriate footballers in France
Ukrainian expatriate sportspeople in France
Expatriate footballers in Poland
Ukrainian expatriate sportspeople in Poland